Greenfield High School is a public high school in Greenfield, Missouri, United States.

References

External links
 Greenfield R-IV Schools

Public high schools in Missouri
Schools in Dade County, Missouri